IPMS may refer to:

 Institution of Professionals, Managers and Specialists, a former British trade union
 Integrated Platform Management System, a distributed architecture system used to operate ships and submarines
 International Plastic Modellers' Society, an international organisation of plastic model-building hobbyists
 International Property Measurement Standards Coalition (IPMSC), a group of organisations working to develop and implement international standards for measuring property